Moldova, officially the Republic of Moldova, is a landlocked country in Eastern Europe. It is bordered by Romania to the west and Ukraine to the north, east, and south. The unrecognised state of Transnistria lies across the Dniester river on the country's eastern border with Ukraine. Moldova's capital and largest city is Chișinău.

Most of Moldovan territory was a part of the Principality of Moldavia from the 14th century until 1812, when it was ceded to the Russian Empire by the Ottoman Empire (to which Moldavia was a vassal state) and became known as Bessarabia. In 1856, southern Bessarabia was returned to Moldavia, which three years later united with Wallachia to form Romania, but Russian rule was restored over the whole of the region in 1878. During the 1917 Russian Revolution, Bessarabia briefly became an autonomous state within the Russian Republic. In February 1918, it declared independence and then integrated into Romania later that year following a vote of its assembly. The decision was disputed by Soviet Russia, which in 1924 established, within the Ukrainian SSR, a so-called Moldavian autonomous republic on partially Moldovan-inhabited territories to the east of Bessarabia.

In 1940, as a consequence of the Molotov–Ribbentrop Pact, Romania was compelled to cede Bessarabia and Northern Bukovina to the Soviet Union, leading to the creation of the Moldavian Soviet Socialist Republic (Moldavian SSR). On 27 August 1991, as the dissolution of the Soviet Union was underway, the Moldavian SSR declared independence and took the name Moldova. However, the strip of Moldovan territory on the east bank of the Dniester has been under the de facto control of the breakaway government of Transnistria since 1990. The constitution of Moldova was adopted in 1994, and the country became a parliamentary republic with a president as head of state and a prime minister as head of government.

Moldova is the second poorest country in Europe by GDP per official capita after Ukraine and much of its GDP is dominated by the service sector. It has one of the lowest Human Development Indexes in Europe, ranking 76th in the world (2022). Moldova is a member state of the United Nations, the Council of Europe, the World Trade Organization, the Organization for Security and Cooperation in Europe, the GUAM Organization for Democracy and Economic Development, the Commonwealth of Independent States, the Organization of the Black Sea Economic Cooperation, and the Association Trio. Moldova has been an official candidate for membership in the European Union since June 2022.

Etymology

The name Moldova is derived from the Moldova River; the valley of this river served as a political centre at the time of the foundation of the Principality of Moldavia in 1359. The origin of the name of the river remains unclear. According to a legend recounted by Moldavian chroniclers Dimitrie Cantemir and Grigore Ureche, Prince Dragoș named the river after hunting aurochs: following the chase, the prince's exhausted hound Molda (Seva) was drowned in the river. The dog's name, given to the river, extended to the principality.

For a short time in the 1990s, at the founding of the Commonwealth of Independent States, the name of the current Republic of Moldova was also spelled Moldavia. After the dissolution of the Soviet Union, the country began to use the Romanian name, Moldova. Officially, the name Republic of Moldova is designated by the United Nations.

History

Prehistory

The prehistory of Moldova covers the period from the Upper Paleolithic which begins with the presence of Homo sapiens in the area of Southeastern Europe some 44,000 years ago and extends into the appearance of the first written records in Classical Antiquity in Greece. In 2010, Oldowan flint tools were discovered at Bayraki that are 800,000–1.2 million years old. During the Neolithic Age, Moldova's territory stood at the centre of the large Cucuteni–Trypillia culture that stretched east beyond the Dniester River in Ukraine and west up to and beyond the Carpathian Mountains in Romania. The people of this civilization, which lasted roughly from 5500 to 2750 BC, practised agriculture, raised livestock, hunted, and made intricately designed pottery.

Antiquity and the early Middle Ages
This area of present-day Moldova was inhabited by ancient Dacians and Moldovans identify themselves with their ancestors. Carpian tribes also inhabited Moldova's territory in the period of classical antiquity. Between the first and seventh centuries AD, the south came intermittently under the control of the Roman and then the Byzantine Empires. Due to its strategic location on a route between Asia and Europe, the territory of modern Moldova experienced many invasions in late antiquity and the Early Middle Ages, notably by Goths, Huns, Avars, Bulgars, Magyars, Pechenegs, Cumans, Mongols and Tatars.

In the 11th century, a Viking by the name of Rodfos was possibly killed in the area by the Blakumen who betrayed him. In 1164, the future Byzantine emperor Andronikos I Komnenos, while attempting to reach the Principality of Halych, was taken prisoner by Vlachs, possibly in the area which now constitutes Moldova.

The East Slavic Hypatian Chronicle (13th century) mentions the Bolohoveni people, who resided on the eastern fringes of Moldovan territory and in the Rus' principalities of Halych, Volhynia and Kyiv; their ethnic origin is disputed by historians. Archaeological research has identified the location of 13th-century fortified settlements in this region. The Bolohoveni disappeared from written chronicles after they were defeated in 1257 by Daniel of Galicia. In the early 13th century, the Brodniks, a possible Slavic–Vlach vassal tribe of Halych, were also present in much of the region's territory.

Founding of the Principality of Moldavia

The Principality of Moldavia began when a Vlach voivode (military leader), Dragoș, arrived in the region of the Moldova River. His people from the voivodeship at Maramureș soon followed. Dragoș established a polity as a vassal to the Kingdom of Hungary in the 1350s. The independence of the Principality of Moldavia came when Bogdan I, another Vlach voivode from Maramureș who had fallen out with the Hungarian king, crossed the Carpathian mountains in 1359 and took control of Moldavia, wresting the region from Hungary. The Principality of Moldavia was bounded by the Carpathian Mountains in the west, the Dniester River in the east, and the Danube River and Black Sea to the south. Its territory comprised the present-day territory of the Republic of Moldova, the eastern eight counties of Romania, and parts of the Chernivtsi Oblast and Budjak region of present-day Ukraine. Locals referred to the principality as Moldova - like the present-day republic and Romania's north-eastern region.

Between Poland and Hungary
The history of what is today Moldova has been intertwined with that of Poland for centuries. The Polish chronicler Jan Długosz mentioned Moldavians as having joined a military expedition in 1342, under King Ladislaus I, against the Margraviate of Brandenburg. The Polish state was powerful enough to counter the Hungarian Kingdom which was consistently interested in bringing the area that would become Moldavia into its political orbit.

Ties between Poland and Moldavia expanded after the founding of the Moldavian state by Bogdan of Cuhea, a Vlach voivode from Maramureș who had fallen out with the Hungarian king. Crossing the Carpathian mountains in 1359, the voivode took control of Moldavia and succeeded in creating Moldavia as an independent political entity. Despite being disfavored by the brief union of Angevin Poland and Hungary (the latter was still the country's overlord), Bogdan's successor Lațcu, the Moldavian ruler also likely allied himself with the Poles. Lațcu also accepted conversion to Roman Catholicism around 1370, but his gesture was to remain without consequences.

Polish influence grows
Petru I profited from the end of the Polish-Hungarian union and moved the country closer to the Jagiellon realm, becoming a vassal of king Jogaila of Poland on 26 September 1387. This gesture was to have unexpected consequences: Petru supplied the Polish ruler with funds needed in the war against the Teutonic Knights, and was granted control over Pokuttya until the debt was to be repaid; as this is not recorded to have been carried out, the region became disputed by the two states, until it was lost by Moldavia in the Battle of Obertyn (1531). Prince Petru also expanded his rule southwards to the Danube Delta. His brother Roman I conquered the Hungarian-ruled Cetatea Albă in 1392, giving Moldavia an outlet to the Black Sea, before being toppled from the throne for supporting Fyodor Koriatovych in his conflict with Vytautas the Great of Lithuania. Under Stephen I, growing Polish influence was challenged by Sigismund of Hungary, whose expedition was defeated at Ghindăoani in 1385; however, Stephen disappeared in mysterious circumstances.

Although Alexander I was brought to the throne in 1400 by the Hungarians (with assistance from Mircea I of Wallachia), this ruler shifted his allegiances towards Poland (notably engaging Moldavian forces on the Polish side in the Battle of Grunwald and the siege of Marienburg), and placed his own choice of rulers in Wallachia. His reign was one of the most successful in Moldavia's history.

Increasing Ottoman influence

For all of his success, it was under the reign of Alexander I that the first confrontation with the Ottoman Turks took place at Cetatea Albă in 1420. A deep crisis was to follow Alexander l's long reign, with his successors battling each other in a succession of wars that divided the country until the murder of Bogdan II and the accession of Peter Aaron in 1451. Nevertheless, Moldavia was subject to further Hungarian interventions after that moment, as Matthias Corvinus deposed Aaron and backed Alexăndrel to the throne in Suceava. Peter Aaron's rule also signified the beginning of Moldavia's Ottoman Empire allegiance, as the ruler was the first to agree to pay tribute to Sultan Mehmed II.

Moldavia at its apogee
Peter Aaron was eventually ousted by his nephew, Stephen the Great who would become the most important medieval Moldavian ruler who managed to uphold Moldavia's autonomy against Hungary, Poland and the Ottoman Empire. Under his rule, which lasted 47 years, Moldavia experienced a glorious political and cultural period.

Age of Invasions
During this time, Moldavia was invaded repeatedly by Crimean Tatars and, beginning in the 15th century, by the Ottoman Turks. In 1538, the principality became a tributary to the Ottoman Empire, but it retained internal and partial external autonomy. Nonetheless, the Polish–Lithuanian Commonwealth continued to strongly influence Moldavia both through national politics as well as on the local level through significant intermarriage between Moldavian nobility and the Polish szlachta. When in May 1600, Michael the Brave removed Ieremia Movilă from Moldavia's throne by winning the battle of Bacău, briefly reuniting under his rule Moldavia, Wallachia, and Transylvania, a Polish army led by Jan Zamoyski drove the Wallachians from Moldavia. Zamoyski reinstalled Ieremia Movilă to the throne, who put the country under the vassalage of the Polish–Lithuanian Commonwealth. Moldavia finally returned to Ottoman vassalage in 1621.

Transnistria
While the region of Transnistria was never politically part of the Principality of Moldavia, there were sizable areas which were owned by Moldavian boyars or the Moldavian rulers. The earliest surviving deeds referring to lands beyond the Dniester river date from the 16th century. Moldavian chronicler Grigore Ureche mentions that in 1584 some Moldavian villages from beyond the Dniester in the Kingdom of Poland were attacked and plundered by Cossacks.  Many Moldavians were members of Cossacks units, with two of them, Ioan Potcoavă and Dănilă Apostol becoming hetmans of Ukraine. Ruxandra Lupu, the daughter of Moldavian voivode Vasile Lupu who married Tymish Khmelnytsky, lived in Rașcov according to Ukrainian tradition.

While most of today's Moldova came into the Ottoman orbit in the 16th century, a substantial part of Transnistria remained a part of the Polish–Lithuanian Commonwealth until the Second Partition of Poland in 1793.

Russian Empire

In accordance with the Treaty of Bucharest of 1812, and despite numerous protests by Moldavian nobles on behalf of the sovereignty of their principality, the Ottoman Empire (of which Moldavia was a vassal) ceded to the Russian Empire the eastern half of the territory of the Principality of Moldavia along with Khotyn and old Bessarabia (modern Budjak), which Russia had already conquered and annexed. The new Russian province was called Oblast of Moldavia and Bessarabia, and initially enjoyed a large degree of autonomy. After 1828 this autonomy was progressively restricted and in 1871 the Oblast was transformed into the Bessarabia Governorate, in a process of state-imposed assimilation, Russification. As part of this process, the Tsarist administration in Bessarabia gradually removed the Moldavian language from official and religious use.

Union with Romania and the return of the Russians
The Treaty of Paris (1856) returned the southern part of Bessarabia (later organised as the Cahul, Bolgrad and Ismail counties) to Moldavia, which remained an autonomous principality and, in 1859, united with Wallachia to form Romania. In 1878, as a result of the Treaty of Berlin, Romania was forced to cede the three counties back to the Russian Empire.

A multiethnic colonization
Over the 19th century, the Russian authorities encouraged the colonization of Bessarabia or parts of it by Russians, Ukrainians, Germans, Bulgarians, Poles, and Gagauzes, primarily in the northern and southern areas vacated by Turks and Nogais, the latter having been expelled in the 1770s and 1780s, during the Russo-Turkish Wars; the inclusion of the province in the Pale of Settlement also allowed the immigration of more Bessarabian Jews. The Moldavian proportion of the population decreased from an estimated 86% in 1816, to around 52% in 1905. During this time there were anti-Semitic riots, leading to an exodus of thousands of Jews to the United States.

Russian Revolution
World War I brought in a rise in political and cultural (ethnic) awareness among the inhabitants of the region, as 300,000 Bessarabians were drafted into the Russian Army formed in 1917; within bigger units several "Moldavian Soldiers' Committees" were formed. The Sfatul Țării proclaimed the Moldavian Democratic Republic within a federal Russian state, and formed a government.

Greater Romania 
On , the Sfatul Țării decided with 86 votes for, 3 against and 36 abstaining, to unite with the Kingdom of Romania. The union was conditional upon fulfilment of the agrarian reform, autonomy, and respect for universal human rights. A part of the interim Parliament agreed to drop these conditions after Bukovina and Transylvania also joined the Kingdom of Romania, although historians note that they lacked the quorum to do so.

This union was recognized by most of the principal Allied Powers in the 1920 Treaty of Paris, which however was not ratified by all of its signatories. The newly Soviet Russia did not recognize Romanian rule over Bessarabia, considering it an occupation of Russian territory. Uprisings against Romanian rule took place in 1919 at Khotyn and Bender, but were eventually suppressed by the Romanian Army.

In May 1919, the Bessarabian Soviet Socialist Republic was proclaimed as a government in exile. After the failure of the Tatarbunary Uprising in 1924, the Moldavian Autonomous Region, created earlier in the Transnistria region, was elevated to an Autonomous Soviet Socialist Republic within the Ukrainian SSR.

World War II and Soviet era

Annexation by the USSR
In August 1939, the Molotov–Ribbentrop Pact and its secret additional protocol were signed, by which Nazi Germany recognized Bessarabia as being within the Soviet sphere of influence, which led the latter to actively revive its claim to the region. On 28 June 1940, the Soviet Union issued an ultimatum to Romania requesting the cession of Bessarabia and Northern Bukovina, with which Romania complied the following day. Soon after, the Moldavian Soviet Socialist Republic (Moldavian SSR, MSSR) was established, comprising about 65% of Bessarabia, and 50% of the now-disbanded Moldavian ASSR (the present-day Transnistria). Ethnic Germans left in 1940.

Reincorporation into Romania and the Soviet occupation
As part of the 1941 Axis invasion of the Soviet Union, Romania regained the territories of Bessarabia and Northern Bukovina, and seized a territory which became known as Transnistria Governorate. Romanian forces, working with the Germans, deported or massacred about 300,000 Jews , including 147,000 from Bessarabia and Bukovina. Of the latter, approximately 90,000 died. Between 1941 and 1944 partisan detachments acted against the Romanian administration. The Soviet Army re-captured the region in February–August 1944, and re-established the Moldavian SSR. Between the end of the Second Jassy–Kishinev Offensive in August 1944 and the end of the war in May 1945, 256,800 inhabitants of the Moldavian SSR were drafted into the Soviet Army. 40,592 of them perished.

During the periods 1940–1941 and 1944–1953, deportations of locals to the northern Urals, to Siberia, and northern Kazakhstan occurred regularly, with the largest ones on 12–13 June 1941, and 5–6 July 1949, accounting from MSSR alone for 18,392 and 35,796 deportees respectively. Other forms of Soviet persecution of the population included political arrests or, in 8,360 cases, execution.

Moldova in the USSR after World War II
In 1946, as a result of a severe drought and excessive delivery quota obligations and requisitions imposed by the Soviet government, the southwestern part of the USSR suffered from a major famine. In 1946–1947, at least 216,000 deaths and about 350,000 cases of dystrophy were accounted by historians in the Moldavian SSR alone. Similar events occurred in the 1930s in the Moldavian ASSR. In 1944–53, there were several anti-Soviet resistance groups in Moldova; however the NKVD and later MGB managed to eventually arrest, execute or deport their members.

In the postwar period, the Soviet government organized the immigration of working age Russian speakers (mostly Russians, Belarusians, and Ukrainians), into the new Soviet republic, especially into urbanized areas, partly to compensate for the demographic loss caused by the war and the emigration of 1940 and 1944. In the 1970s and 1980s, the Moldavian SSR received substantial allocations from the budget of the USSR to develop industrial and scientific facilities and housing. In 1971, the Council of Ministers of the USSR adopted a decision "About the measures for further development of the city of Kishinev" (modern Chișinău), that allotted more than one billion roubles (approximately 6.8 billion in 2018 US dollars) from the USSR budget for building projects.

The Soviet government conducted a campaign to promote a Moldovan ethnic identity distinct from that of the Romanians, based on a theory developed during the existence of the Moldavian ASSR. Official Soviet policy asserted that the language spoken by Moldovans was distinct from the Romanian language (see Moldovenism). To distinguish the two, during the Soviet period, Moldovan was written in the Cyrillic alphabet, in contrast with Romanian, which since 1860 had been written in the Latin alphabet.

All independent organizations were severely reprimanded, with the National Patriotic Front leaders being sentenced in 1972 to long prison terms. The Commission for the Study of the Communist Dictatorship in Moldova is assessing the activity of the communist totalitarian regime.

Glasnost and Perestroika
In the 1980s, amid political conditions created by glasnost and perestroika, a Democratic Movement of Moldova was formed, which in 1989 became known as the nationalist Popular Front of Moldova (FPM). Along with several other Soviet republics, from 1988 onwards, Moldova started to move towards independence. On 27 August 1989, the FPM organized a mass demonstration in Chișinău that became known as the Grand National Assembly. The assembly pressured the authorities of the Moldavian SSR to adopt a language law on 31 August 1989 that proclaimed the Moldovan language written in the Latin script to be the state language of the MSSR. Its identity with the Romanian language was also established. In 1989, as opposition to the Communist Party grew, there were major riots in November.

Independence and aftermath

The first democratic elections for the local parliament were held in February and March 1990. Mircea Snegur was elected as Speaker of the Parliament, and Mircea Druc as Prime Minister. On 23 June 1990, the Parliament adopted the Declaration of Sovereignty of the "Soviet Socialist Republic Moldova", which, among other things, stipulated the supremacy of Moldovan laws over those of the Soviet Union. After the failure of the 1991 Soviet coup d'état attempt, Moldova declared its independence on 27 August 1991.

On 21 December of the same year, Moldova, along with most of the other Soviet republics, signed the constitutive act that formed the post-Soviet Commonwealth of Independent States (CIS). Moldova received official recognition on 25 December. On 26 December 1991, the Soviet Union ceased to exist. Declaring itself a neutral state, Moldova did not join the military branch of the CIS. Three months later, on 2 March 1992, the country gained formal recognition as an independent state at the United Nations. In 1994, Moldova became a member of NATO's Partnership for Peace program, and a member of the Council of Europe on 29 June 1995.

Transnistria breaks away (1990 to present)

In the region east of the Dniester river, Transnistria, which includes a large proportion of predominantly russophone East Slavs of Ukrainian (28%) and Russian (26%) descent (altogether 54% as of 1989), an independent Pridnestrovian Moldavian Soviet Socialist Republic was proclaimed on 16 August 1990, with its capital in Tiraspol. The motives behind this move were fear of the rise of nationalism in Moldova. In the winter of 1991–1992, clashes occurred between Transnistrian forces, supported by elements of the 14th Guards Army, and the Moldovan police. Between 2 March and 26 July 1992, the conflict escalated into a military engagement. It was a brief war between Moldovan and separatist Transnistrian forces, with Russia intervening militarily on Transnistria's side. It ended with a ceasefire and the establishment of a security zone policed by a three-way peacekeeping force of Russian, Transnistrian, and Moldovan personnel.

Market economy (1992) 
On 2 January 1992, Moldova introduced a market economy, liberalizing prices, which resulted in rapid inflation. From 1992 to 2001, the country suffered a serious economic crisis, leaving most of the population below the poverty line. In 1993, the Government of Moldova introduced a new national currency, the Moldovan leu, to replace the temporary cupon. The economy of Moldova began to change in 2001; and until 2008, the country saw a steady annual growth between 5% and 10%. The early 2000s also saw a considerable growth of emigration of Moldovans looking for work (mostly illegally) in Russia (especially the Moscow region), Italy, Portugal, Spain, and other countries; remittances from Moldovans abroad account for almost 38% of Moldova's GDP, the second-highest percentage in the world, after Tajikistan (45%).

Elections: 1994-2009
In the 1994 parliamentary elections, the Democratic Agrarian Party gained a majority of the seats, setting a turning point in Moldovan politics. With the nationalist Popular Front now in a parliamentary minority, new measures aiming to moderate the ethnic tensions in the country could be adopted. Plans for a union with Romania were abandoned, and the new Constitution gave autonomy to the breakaway Transnistria and Gagauzia. On 23 December 1994, the Parliament of Moldova adopted a "Law on the Special Legal Status of Gagauzia", and in 1995, the latter was constituted.

After winning the 1996 presidential elections, on 15 January 1997, Petru Lucinschi, the former First Secretary of the Moldavian Communist Party in 1989–91, became the country's second president (1997–2001), succeeding Mircea Snegur (1991–1996). In 2000, the Constitution was amended, transforming Moldova into a parliamentary republic, with the president being chosen through indirect election rather than direct popular vote.

Winning 49.9% of the vote, the Party of Communists of the Republic of Moldova (reinstituted in 1993 after being outlawed in 1991), gained 71 of the 101 MPs, and on 4 April 2001, elected Vladimir Voronin as the country's third president (re-elected in 2005). The country became the first post-Soviet state where a non-reformed Communist Party returned to power. New governments were formed by Vasile Tarlev (19 April 2001 – 31 March 2008), and Zinaida Greceanîi (31 March 2008 – 14 September 2009). In 2001–2003, relations between Moldova and Russia improved, but then temporarily deteriorated in 2003–2006, in the wake of the failure of the Kozak memorandum, culminating in the 2006 wine exports crisis. The Party of Communists of the Republic of Moldova managed to stay in power for eight years.

In the April 2009 parliamentary elections, the Communist Party won 49.48% of the votes, followed by the Liberal Party with 13.14% of the votes, the Liberal Democratic Party with 12.43%, and the Alliance "Moldova Noastră" with 9.77%. The controversial results of this election sparked the April 2009 Moldovan parliamentary election protests.

Stalemate 2009-2012 

In August 2009, four Moldovan parties (Liberal Democratic Party, Liberal Party, Democratic Party, and Our Moldova Alliance) agreed to create the Alliance For European Integration that pushed the Party of Communists of the Republic of Moldova into opposition. On 28 August 2009, this coalition chose a new parliament speaker (Mihai Ghimpu) in a vote that was boycotted by Communist legislators. Vladimir Voronin, who had been President of Moldova since 2001, eventually resigned on 11 September 2009, but the Parliament failed to elect a new president. The acting president Mihai Ghimpu instituted the Commission for constitutional reform in Moldova to adopt a new version of the Constitution of Moldova. After the constitutional referendum aimed to approve the reform failed in September 2010, the parliament was dissolved again and a new parliamentary election was scheduled for 28 November 2010. On 30 December 2010, Marian Lupu was elected as the Speaker of the Parliament and the acting President of the Republic of Moldova. In March 2012, Nicolae Timofti was elected as president of Moldova in a parliamentary vote, becoming the first full-time president since Vladimir Voronin, a Communist, resigned in September 2009. Before the election of Timofti, Moldova had had three acting presidents in three years. After the Alliance for European Integration lost a no confidence vote, the Pro-European Coalition was formed on 30 May 2013.

Banking crisis
In November 2014, Moldova's central bank took control of Banca de Economii, the country's largest lender, and two smaller institutions, Banca Sociala and Unibank. Investigations into activities at these three banks uncovered large-scale fraud by means of fraudulent loans to business entities controlled by a Moldovan-Israeli business oligarch, Ilan Shor, of funds worth about 1 billion U.S. dollars. The large scale of the fraud compared to the size of the Moldovan economy is cited as tilting the country's politics in favour of the pro-Russian Party of Socialists of the Republic of Moldova. In 2015, Shor was still at large, after a period of house arrest.

Pavel Filip's government (2016-2019)
Following a period of political instability and massive public protests, a new government led by Pavel Filip was invested in January 2016. Concerns over statewide corruption, the independence of the judiciary system, and the nontransparency of the banking system were expressed. Germany's broadcaster Deutsche Welle also raised concerns about the alleged influence of Moldovan oligarch Vladimir Plahotniuc over the Filip government.

In the December 2016 presidential election, Socialist, pro-Russian Igor Dodon was elected as the new president of the republic.

2019 constitutional crisis

In 2019, from 7 to 15 June, the Moldovan government went through a period of dual power in what is known as the 2019 Moldovan constitutional crisis. On 7 June, the Constitutional Court, which is largely believed to be controlled by Vladimir Plahotniuc from the Democratic Party, announced that they had temporarily removed the sitting president, Igor Dodon, from power due to his ‘inability’ to call new parliamentary elections as the parliament did not form a coalition within three months of the validation of the election results. According to Moldovan constitutional law, the president may call snap elections if no government is formed after three months. However, on 8 June, the NOW Platform DA and PAS reached an agreement with the Socialist party forming a government led by Maia Sandu as the new prime minister, pushing the Democratic Party out of power. This new government was also supported by Igor Dodon. The new coalition and Igor Dodon argued that the president may call snap elections after consulting the parliament but is not obliged to do so. Additionally, because the election results were verified on 9 March, three months should be interpreted as three calendar months, not 90 days as was the case. The former prime minister, Pavel Filip from the Democratic Party, said that new parliamentary elections would be held on 6 September and refused to recognize the new coalition, calling it an illegal government. After a week of dual government meetings, some protest, and the international community mostly supporting the new government coalition, Pavel Filip stepped down as prime minister but still called for new elections. The Constitutional Court reversed the decision on 15 June, effectively ending the crisis.

COVID-19 pandemic
In March 2020, due to the COVID-19 pandemic, the government called a "national red code alert" as the number of coronavirus cases in the country rose to six on 13 March 2020. Government "banned all gatherings of over 50 people until 1 April 2020 and closed all schools and kindergartens in an attempt to curb the spread of the virus". Flights were banned to Spain, Italy, France, Austria, Belgium, Czech Republic, Cyprus, Germany, Ireland, the U.K., Poland, Portugal and Romania. On 17 March, Parliament declared a state of emergency for at least 60 days, suspended all international flights and closed borders with neighbours Romania and Ukraine. Moldova reported 29 cases of the disease on 17 March 2020. The country reported its first death from the disease on 18 March 2020, when the total number of cases reached 30.

Presidency of Maia Sandu since 2020 

In the November 2020 presidential election, the pro-European opposition candidate Maia Sandu was elected as the new president of the republic, defeating incumbent pro-Russian president Igor Dodon and thus becoming the first female elected president of Moldova. In December 2020, Prime Minister Ion Chicu, who had led a pro-Russian government since November 2019, resigned a day before Sandu was sworn in. The parliament, dominated by pro-Russian Socialists, did not accept any Prime Minister candidate proposed by the new president. On 28 April 2021, Sandu dissolved the Parliament of the Republic of Moldova after the Constitutional Court ended Moldova's state of emergency which had been brought about by the coronavirus pandemic. Parliamentary elections took place on 11 July 2021. The snap parliamentary elections resulted in a landslide win for the pro-European Party of Action and Solidarity (PAS). On 6 August 2021, the Natalia Gavrilița-led cabinet was sworn in to office with 61 votes, all from the Party of Action and Solidarity (PAS). She resigned on 10 February 2023.

Russian invasion of neighbouring Ukraine 

In February 2022 Sandu condemned the Russian invasion of Ukraine, calling it "a blatant breach of international law and of Ukrainian sovereignty and territorial integrity." Prime Minister Natalia Gavrilita stated on 28 February 2022 that Moldova should rapidly move to become a member of the European Union; the country submitted a formal application for EU membership on 3 March 2022, and was subsequently granted the status of candidate country by the European Council on 23 June 2022 along with Ukraine.

On 26 April 2022, authorities from the Transnistria region said two transmitting antennas broadcasting Russian radio programs at Grigoriopol transmitter broadcasting facility near the town of Maiac in the Grigoriopol District near the Ukrainian border had been blown up and the previous evening, the premises of the Transnistrian state security service had been attacked. The Russian army has a military base and a large ammunition dump in the region. Russia has about 1,500 soldiers stationed in breakaway Transnistria. They are supposed to serve there as peacekeepers.

On 24 May 2022, the former president of Moldova, Igor Dodon, was arrested. Dodon, leader of Moldova's main pro-Russian opposition, the Socialist Party, was accused of taking bribes. Moldova's pro-Western and pro-Russian factions became increasingly divided since Russia's invasion of Ukraine.

On 31 October 2022, Moldova's Interior Ministry said that debris from a Russian missile landed in the northern village of Naslavcea after a Russian fusillade was intercepted by air defenses in neighboring Ukraine. The Ministry reported no people were hurt but the windows of several residential homes were shattered. The Russian strike was targeting a Ukrainian dam on the Nistru river that runs through Moldova and Ukraine. On 5 December, another missile fell near the city of Briceni as Russia launched another wave of missile strikes against Ukraine. Yet another missile fell into Larga on 14 January 2023 as a result of another wave of missile strikes against Ukraine.

Government

Moldova is a unitary parliamentary representative democratic republic. The 1994 Constitution of Moldova sets the framework for the government of the country. A parliamentary majority of at least two-thirds is required to amend the Constitution of Moldova, which cannot be revised in times of war or national emergency. Amendments to the Constitution affecting the state's sovereignty, independence, or unity can only be made after a majority of voters support the proposal in a referendum. Furthermore, no revision can be made to limit the fundamental rights of people enumerated in the Constitution. The country's central legislative body is the unicameral Moldovan Parliament, which has 101 seats, and whose members are elected by popular vote on party lists every four years.

The head of state is the President of Moldova, who between 2001 and 2015 was elected by the Moldovan Parliament, requiring the support of three-fifths of the deputies (at least 61 votes). This system was designed to decrease executive authority in favour of the legislature. Nevertheless, the Constitutional Court ruled on 4 March 2016, that this constitutional change adopted in 2000 regarding the presidential election was unconstitutional, thus reverting the election method of the president to a two-round system direct election. The president appoints a prime minister who functions as the head of government, and who in turn assembles a cabinet, both subject to parliamentary approval.

The 1994 constitution also establishes an independent Constitutional Court, composed of six judges (two appointed by the President, two by Parliament, and two by the Supreme Council of Magistrature), serving six-year terms, during which they are irremovable and not subordinate to any power. The court is invested with the power of judicial review over all acts of parliament, over presidential decrees, and over international treaties signed by the country.

Internal affairs

On 19 December 2016, Moldovan MPs approved raising the retirement age to 63 years from the current level of 57 for women and 62 for men, a reform that is part of a 3-year-old assistance program agreed with the International Monetary Fund. The retirement age will be lifted gradually by a few months every year until it is fully in effect in 2028.

Life expectancy in the ex-Soviet country is 67.5 years for men and 75.5 years for women, both among the poorest in Europe. In a country with a population of 3.5 million, of which 1 million are abroad, there are more than 700,000 pensioners.

Foreign relations
After achieving independence from the Soviet Union, Moldova's foreign policy was designed with a view to establishing relations with other European countries, neutrality, and European Union integration. In 1995 the country was admitted to the Council of Europe.

In addition to its participation in NATO's Partnership for Peace programme, Moldova is also a member state of the United Nations, the Organization for Security and Co-operation in Europe (OSCE), the North Atlantic Cooperation Council, the World Trade Organization, the International Monetary Fund, the World Bank, the Francophonie and the European Bank for Reconstruction and Development.

In 2005, Moldova and the European Union established an action plan that sought to improve cooperation between Moldova and the union. At the end of 2005, the European Union Border Assistance Mission to Moldova and Ukraine (EUBAM) was established at the joint request of the presidents of Moldova and Ukraine. EUBAM assists the Moldovan and Ukrainian governments in approximating their border and customs procedures to EU standards and offers support in both countries' fight against cross-border crime.

After the 1990–1992 War of Transnistria, Moldova sought a peaceful resolution to the conflict in the Transnistria region by working with Romania, Ukraine, and Russia, calling for international mediation, and co-operating with the OSCE and UN fact-finding and observer missions. The foreign minister of Moldova, Andrei Stratan, repeatedly stated that the Russian troops stationed in the breakaway region were there against the will of the Moldovan government and called on them to leave "completely and unconditionally". In 2012, a security zone incident resulted in the death of a civilian, raising tensions with Russia.

In September 2010, the European Parliament approved a grant of €90 million to Moldova. The money was to supplement US$570 million in International Monetary Fund loans, World Bank and other bilateral support already granted to Moldova. In April 2010, Romania offered Moldova development aid worth of €100 million while the number of scholarships for Moldovan students doubled to 5,000. According to a lending agreement signed in February 2010, Poland provided US$15 million as a component of its support for Moldova in its European integration efforts. The first joint meeting of the Governments of Romania and Moldova, held in March 2012, concluded with several bilateral agreements in various fields. The European orientation "has been the policy of Moldova in recent years and this is the policy that must continue," Nicolae Timofti told lawmakers before his election in 2012.

On 29 November 2013, at a summit in Vilnius, Moldova signed an association agreement with the European Union dedicated to the European Union's 'Eastern Partnership' with ex-Soviet countries. The ex-Romanian President Traian Băsescu stated that Romania will make all efforts for Moldova to join the EU as soon as possible. Likewise, Traian Băsescu declared that the unification of Moldova with Romania is the next national project for Romania, as more than 75% of the population speaks Romanian.

Moldova signed the Association Agreement with the European Union in Brussels on 27 June 2014. The signing came after the accord was drafted in Vilnius in November 2013.

Religious leaders play a role in shaping foreign policy. Since the fall of the Soviet Union, the Russian Government has frequently used its connections with the Russian Orthodox Church to block and stymie the integration of former Soviet states like Moldova into the West.

Moldova signed the membership application to join the EU on 3 March 2022. On 23 June 2022, Moldova was officially granted candidate status by EU leaders.

Military

The Moldovan armed forces consists of the Ground Forces and Air Force. Moldova has accepted all relevant arms control obligations of the former Soviet Union. On 30 October 1992, Moldova ratified the Treaty on Conventional Armed Forces in Europe, which establishes comprehensive limits on key categories of conventional military equipment and provides for the destruction of weapons in excess of those limits. The country acceded to the provisions of the nuclear Non-Proliferation Treaty in October 1994 in Washington, D.C. It does not have nuclear, biological, chemical or radiological weapons. Moldova joined the North Atlantic Treaty Organization's Partnership for Peace on 16 March 1994.

Moldova is committed to a number of international and regional control of arms regulations such as the UN Firearms Protocol, Stability Pact Regional Implementation Plan, the UN Programme of Action (PoA) and the OSCE Documents on Stockpiles of Conventional Ammunition.

Since declaring independence in 1991, Moldova has participated in UN peacekeeping missions in Liberia, Côte d'Ivoire, Sudan and Georgia.

Moldova signed a military agreement with Romania to strengthen regional security. The agreement is part of Moldova's strategy to reform its military and cooperate with its neighbours.

On 12 November 2014, the US donated to Moldovan Armed Forces 39 Humvees and 10 trailers, with a value of US$700,000, to the 22nd Peacekeeping Battalion of the Moldovan National Army to "increase the capability of Moldovan peacekeeping contingents."

Human rights

According to Amnesty International, as of 2004 "Torture and other ill-treatment in police detention remained widespread; the state failed to carry out prompt and impartial investigations and police officers sometimes evaded penalties. Political dissidents from Ilașcu Group were released from arbitrary detention in the break-away Transdinester region only after an order of the European Court of Human Rights." In 2009, when Moldova experienced its most serious civil unrest in a decade, several civilians, including Valeriu Boboc, were killed and many more injured.

According to Human Rights Report of the United States Department of State, released in April 2011, "In contrast to the previous year, there were no reports of killings by security forces. During the year reports of government exercising undue influence over the media substantially decreased." But "Transnistrian authorities continued to harass independent media and opposition lawmakers; restrict freedom of association, movement, and religion; and discriminate against Romanian speakers." Moldova "has made noteworthy progress on religious freedom since the era of the Soviet Union, but it can still take further steps to foster diversity," said the UN Special Rapporteur on freedom of religion or belief Heiner Bielefeldt, in Chișinău, in September 2011. Moldova improved its legislation by enacting the Law on Preventing and Combating Family Violence, in 2008.

Administrative divisions

Moldova is divided into 32 districts (raioane, singular raion), three municipalities and two autonomous regions (Gagauzia and the Left Bank of the Dniester). The final status of Transnistria is disputed, as the central government does not control that territory. 10 other cities, including Comrat and Tiraspol, the administrative seats of the two autonomous territories, also have municipality status.

Moldova has 66 cities (towns), including 13 with municipality status, and 916 communes. Another 700 villages are too small to have a separate administration and are administratively part of either cities (41 of them) or communes (659). This makes for a total of 1,682 localities in Moldova, two of which are uninhabited.

The largest city in Moldova is Chișinău with a population of 635,994 people.

Geography

Moldova lies between latitudes 45° and 49° N, and mostly between meridians 26° and 30° E (a small area lies east of 30°). The total land area is 

The largest part of the country (around 88% of the area) lies in Bessarabia region, between Prut and Dniester rivers, while a narrow strip in the east is located in Transnistria (east of the Dniester). The western border of Moldova is formed by the Prut river, which joins the Danube before flowing into the Black Sea. In the east, the Dniester is the main river, flowing through the country from north to south, receiving the waters of Răut, Bîc, Ichel, Botna. Ialpug flows into one of the Danube limans, while Cogâlnic into the Black Sea chain of limans.

The country is landlocked, though it is close to the Black Sea; at its closest point it is separated from the Dniester Liman, an estuary of the Black Sea, by only 3 km of Ukrainian territory. While most of the country is hilly, elevations never exceed  – the highest point being the Bălănești Hill. Moldova's hills are part of the Moldavian Plateau, which geologically originate from the Carpathian Mountains. Its subdivisions in Moldova include the Dniester Hills (Northern Moldavian Hills and Dniester Ridge), the Moldavian Plain (Middle Prut Valley and Bălți Steppe), and the Central Moldavian Plateau (Ciuluc-Soloneț Hills, Cornești Hills—Codri Massive, "Codri" meaning "forests"—Lower Dniester Hills, Lower Prut Valley, and Tigheci Hills). In the south, the country has a small flatland, the Bugeac Plain. The territory of Moldova east of the river Dniester is split between parts of the Podolian Plateau, and parts of the Eurasian Steppe.

The country's main cities are the capital Chișinău, in the centre of the country, Tiraspol (in the eastern region of Transnistria), Bălți (in the north) and Bender (in the south-east). Comrat is the administrative centre of Gagauzia.

Climate

Moldova has a climate which is moderately continental; its proximity to the Black Sea leads to the climate being mildly cold in the autumn and winter and relatively cool in the spring and summer.

The heaviest rainfall occurs in early summer and again in October; heavy showers and thunderstorms are common. Because of the irregular terrain, heavy summer rains often cause erosion and river silting.

Biodiversity

Phytogeographically, Moldova is split between the East European Plain and the Pontic–Caspian steppe of the Circumboreal Region within the Boreal Kingdom. It is home to three terrestrial ecoregions: Central European mixed forests, East European forest steppe, and Pontic steppe. Forests currently cover only 11% of Moldova, though the state is making efforts to increase their range. It had a 2019 Forest Landscape Integrity Index mean score of 2.2/10, ranking it 158th globally out of 172 countries. Game animals, such as red deer, roe deer and wild boar can be found in these wooded areas.

The environment of Moldova suffered extreme degradation during the Soviet period, when industrial and agricultural development proceeded without regard for environmental protection. Excessive use of pesticides resulted in heavily polluted topsoil, and industries lacked emission controls. Founded in 1990, the Ecological Movement of Moldova, a national, non-governmental, nonprofit organization which is a member of the International Union for Conservation of Nature has been working to restore Moldova's damaged natural environment. The movement is national representative of the Center "Naturopa" of the Council of Europe and United Nations Environment Programme of the United Nations.

Once possessing a range from the British Isles through Central Asia over the Bering Strait into Alaska and Canada's Yukon as well as the Northwest Territories, saigas survived in Moldova and Romania into the late 18th century. Deforestation, demographic pressure, as well as excessive hunting eradicated the native saiga herds which is currently threatened with extinction. They were considered a characteristic animal of Scythia in antiquity. Historian Strabo referred to the saigas as the kolos, describing it as "between the deer and ram in size" which (understandably but wrongly) was believed to drink through its nose.

Another animal which was extinct in Moldova since the 18th century until recently was the European Wood Bison or wisent. The species was reintroduced with the arrival of three European bison from Białowieża Forest in Poland several days before Moldova's Independence Day on 27 August 2005. Moldova is currently interested in expanding their wisent population, and began talks with Belarus in 2019 regarding a bison exchange program between the two countries.

Economy

After the breakup of the USSR in 1991, energy shortages, political uncertainty, trade obstacles and weak administrative capacity contributed to the decline of Moldova's economy. As a part of an ambitious economic liberalization effort, Moldova introduced a convertible currency, liberalized all prices, stopped issuing preferential credits to state enterprises, backed steady land privatization, removed export controls, and liberalized interest rates. The government entered into agreements with the World Bank and the International Monetary Fund to promote growth. 
The economy subsequently declined from 1991 to 1999. Since 2000, however, the country's GDP (PPP) grew significantly:

Although estimates point to possible modest overvaluation of the real exchange rate, external competitiveness appears broadly adequate as reflected in strong sustained export performance. However, the near-term economic outlook is weak. Main risks to the near-term outlook relate to serious vulnerabilities and governance issues in the banking sector, policy slippages in the run up to the elections, intensification of geopolitical tensions in the region, and a further slowdown in activity in main trading partners.

Moldova remains highly vulnerable to fluctuations in remittances from workers abroad (which constitute 24 percent of GDP), exports to the Commonwealth of Independent States (CIS) and European Union (EU) (88 per cent of total exports), and donor support (about 10 per cent of government spending). The main transmission channels through which adverse exogenous shocks could impact the Moldovan economy are remittances (also due to potentially returning migrants), external trade, and capital flows.

Moldova largely achieved the main objectives of the combined ECF/EFF (IMF financial credit) supported program. The economy recovered from the drought-related contraction in 2012.

The gross average monthly salary in the Republic of Moldova has registered a steady positive growth after 1999, being 5906 lei or 298 euros in 2018.

Corporate governance in the banking sector is a major concern. In line with FSAP recommendations, significant weaknesses in the legal and regulatory frameworks must be urgently addressed to ensure stability and soundness of the financial sector. Moldova has achieved a substantial degree of fiscal consolidation in recent years, but this trend is now reversing. Resisting pre-election pressures for selective spending increases and returning to the path of fiscal consolidation would reduce reliance on exceptionally high donor support. Structural fiscal reforms would help safeguard sustainability. Monetary policy has been successful in maintaining inflation within the NBM's target range. The implementation of structural reforms outlined in the National Development Strategy (NDS) Moldova 2020—especially in the business environment, physical infrastructure, and human resources development areas—would help boost potential growth and reduce poverty. Moldova's remarkable recovery from the severe recession of 2009 was largely the result of sound macroeconomic and financial policies and structural reforms. Despite a small contraction in 2012, Moldova's economic performance was among the strongest in the region during 2010–13. Economic activity grew cumulatively by about 24 percent; consumer price inflation was brought under control; and real wages increased cumulatively by about 13 percent. This expansion was made possible by adequate macroeconomic stabilization measures and ambitious structural reforms implemented in the wake of the crisis under a Fund-supported program. In November 2013, Moldova initialed an Association Agreement with the EU which includes provisions establishing a Deep and Comprehensive Free Trade Area (DCFTA).

A political crisis in early 2013 led to policy slippages in the fiscal and financial areas. The political crisis that broke out in early 2013 was resolved with the appointment of a government supported by a pro-European center-right/center coalition in May 2013. However, delays in policy implementation prevented completion of the final reviews under the ECF/EFF arrangements.

Despite a sharp decline in poverty in recent years, Moldova remains one of the poorest countries in Europe and structural reforms are needed to promote sustainable growth. Based on the Europe and Central Asia (ECA) regional poverty line of US$5/day (PPP), 55 percent of the population was poor in 2011. While this was significantly lower than 94 percent in 2002, Moldova's poverty rate is still more than double the ECA average of 25 percent. The NDS—Moldova (National Development System) 2020, which was published in November 2012, focuses on several critical areas to boost economic development and reduce poverty. These include education, infrastructure, financial sector, business climate, energy consumption, pension system, and judicial framework. Following the regional financial crisis in 1998, Moldova has made significant progress towards achieving and retaining macroeconomic and financial stabilization. It has, furthermore, implemented many structural and institutional reforms that are indispensable for the efficient functioning of a market economy. These efforts have helped maintain macroeconomic and financial stability under difficult external circumstances, enabled the resumption of economic growth and contributed to establishing an environment conducive to the economy's further growth and development in the medium term.

The government's goal of EU integration has resulted in some market-oriented progress. Moldova experienced better than expected economic growth in 2013 due to increased agriculture production, to economic policies adopted by the Moldovan government since 2009, and to the receipt of EU trade preferences connecting Moldovan products to the world's largest market. Moldova has signed the Association Agreement and the Deep and Comprehensive Free Trade Agreement with the European Union during summer 2014. Moldova has also achieved a Free Visa Regime with the EU which represents the biggest achievement of Moldovan diplomacy since independence. Still, growth has been hampered by high prices for Russian natural gas, a Russian import ban on Moldovan wine, increased foreign scrutiny of Moldovan agricultural products, and by Moldova's large external debt. Over the longer term, Moldova's economy remains vulnerable to political uncertainty, weak administrative capacity, vested bureaucratic interests, corruption, higher fuel prices, Russian pressure, and the separatist regime in Moldova's Transnistria region.
According to IMF World Economic Outlook April 2014, the Moldovan GDP (PPP) per capita is 3,927 International Dollars, excluding grey economy and tax evasion.

Energy

With few natural energy resources, Moldova imports almost all of its energy supplies from Russia and Ukraine. Moldova's dependence on Russian energy is underscored by a growing US$5 billion debt to Russian natural gas supplier Gazprom, largely the result of unreimbursed natural gas consumption in the separatist Transnistria region. In August 2013, work began on a new pipeline between Moldova and Romania that may eventually break Russia's monopoly on Moldova's gas supplies. Moldova is a partner country of the EU INOGATE energy programme, which has four key topics: enhancing energy security, convergence of member state energy markets on the basis of EU internal energy market principles, supporting sustainable energy development, and attracting investment for energy projects of common and regional interest.

Wine industry

The country has a well-established wine industry. Most of the country's wine production is made for export. Many families have their own recipes and grape varieties that have been passed down through the generations. There are 3 historical wine regions: Valul lui Traian (south west), Stefan Voda (south east) and Codru (center), destined for the production of wines with protected geographic indication. Mileștii Mici is the home of the largest wine cellar in the world.

Agriculture

Moldova's rich soil and temperate continental climate (with warm summers and mild winters) have made the country one of the most productive agricultural regions since ancient times, and a major supplier of agricultural products in southeastern Europe. In agriculture, the economic reform started with the land cadastre reform.
Moldova's agricultural products include vegetables, fruits, grapes, wine, and grains.

Transport

The main means of transportation in Moldova are railways  and a highway system ( overall, including  of paved surfaces). The sole international air gateway of Moldova is the Chișinău International Airport. The Giurgiulești terminal on the Danube is compatible with small seagoing vessels. Shipping on the lower Prut and Nistru rivers plays only a modest role in the country's transportation system.

Telecommunications

The first million mobile telephone users were registered in September 2005. The number of mobile telephone users in Moldova increased by 47.3% in the first quarter of 2008 against the last year and exceeded 2.89 million.

In September 2009, Moldova was the first country in the world to launch high-definition voice services (HD voice) for mobile phones, and the first country in Europe to launch 14.4 Mbit/s mobile broadband on a national scale, with over 40% population coverage.

, there are around 1,295,000 Internet users in Moldova with overall Internet penetration of 35.9%.

On 6 June 2012, the Government approved the licensing of 4G / LTE for mobile operators.

Demographics

Ethnic composition
As of the 2014 census, Moldovans were the largest ethnic group of Moldova (75.1% of the population). In addition, 7.0% of the population declared themselves Romanians, amid the controversy over ethnic and linguistic identity in Moldova. Although historical, the polarization based on ethnolinguistic criteria of the majority ethnic group reappeared with the national revival movement of the late 1980s, and, so far, there is no consensus regarding the mainstream identity in the Republic of Moldova (Moldovan or Romanian).

The country also has important minority ethnic communities, as shown in the table below. Gagauz, 4.4% of the population, are Christian Turkic people. Greeks, Armenians, Poles, Ukrainians, although not numerous, were present as early as the 17th century, and have contributed cultural marks. The 19th century saw the arrival of many more Ukrainians from Podolia and Galicia, as well as new communities, such as Lipovans, Russians, Bulgarians, and Germans. Most of Moldova's Jewish population emigrated between 1979 and 2004.

According to the 2014 census preliminary data, 2,998,235 inhabitants lived in Moldova (within the areas controlled by the central government), an 11.3% decrease from the figure recorded at the 2004 census. It is estimated that, as of 2022, 43.2% of the total population live in urban areas, and that the urbanization rate is 0.09%.

According to the last census in Transnistria (October 2015), the population of the region was 475,373, a 14.47% decrease from the figure recorded at the 2004 census. The urbanization rate was 69.9%. By ethnic composition, the population of Transnistria was distributed as follows: Russians - 29.1%, Moldovans - 28.6%, Ukrainians - 22.9%, Bulgarians - 2.4%, Gagauzians - 1.1%, Belarusians - 0.5%, Transnistrian - 0.2%, other nationalities - 1.4%. About 14% of the population did not declare their nationality. Also, for the first time, the population had the option to identify as "Transnistrian".

Languages

The official language of Moldova is Romanian, a Romance language.

The 1991 Declaration of Independence names the official language Romanian. The Constitution of 1994 stated that the national language of the Republic of Moldova was Moldovan, and its writing is based on the Latin alphabet.

In 2013, the Constitutional Court of Moldova ruled that the name "Romanian", as used in the Declaration of Independence to identify the official language, prevails over the name "Moldovan", given in Article 13 of the Constitution.

At the 2014 census (which did not include data from the Transnistrian region), 54.7% of the population named Moldovan whereas 24.0% named Romanian as their first language in daily use. Although only 4.1% are ethnic Russians, Russian is still used as the main language by 14.5% of the total population. Around 50% of ethnic Ukrainians, 33% of Gagauz, 33% of Bulgarians, and 5.7% of Moldovans declared Russian as their daily use language.

Historically Russian was taught in schools as the first foreign language, because of the relationship with the Russian Empire and Soviet Union. In the 21st century, the primary foreign language taught in the schools is English. In 2013 more than 60% of schoolchildren took it as their first foreign language. This was followed by French, taken by less than 50% of students. Since 1996, the Republic of Moldova has been a full member of La Francophonie. German was the third-ranked choice.

Religion

The Metropolis of Chișinău and All Moldova (the Moldovan Orthodox Church), autonomous and subordinated to the Russian Orthodox Church, and the Metropolis of Bessarabia (the Bessarabian Orthodox Church), autonomous and subordinated to the Romanian Orthodox Church, both claim to be the national church of the country. For the 2004 census, Orthodox Christians, who make up 93.3% of Moldova's population, were not required to declare the particular of the two main churches they belong to. As of 2020, the U.S. Department of State estimated that 90% of the Orthodox adherents belong to the Moldovan Orthodox Church. More than 2.0% of the population is Protestant including a growing number of Jehovah's Witnesses, 0.9% belongs to other religions, 1.0% is non-religious, 0.4% is atheist, and 2.2% did not answer the religion question at the census.

Education

There are 16 state and 15 private institutions of higher education in Moldova, with a total of 126,100 students, including 104,300 in the state institutions and 21,700 in the private ones. The number of students per 10,000 inhabitants in Moldova has been constantly growing since the collapse of the Soviet Union, reaching 217 in 2000–2001, and 351 in 2005–2006.

The National Library of Moldova was founded in 1832. The Moldova State University and the Academy of Sciences of Moldova, the main scientific organizations of Moldova, were established in 1946. The Republic of Moldova was ranked 64th in the Global Innovation Index in 2021, down from 58th in 2019.

, Romania allocates 5,000 scholarships in high schools and universities for Moldovan students. Likewise, more than half of preschool children in Moldova benefit from Romania funded program to renovate and equip kindergartens. Almost all the population is literate: the literacy rate of the population aged 15 and over is estimated at 99.4%.

Crime

The CIA World Factbook lists widespread crime and underground economic activity among major issues in Moldova. Human trafficking of Moldovan women and children to other parts of Europe is a serious problem.

In 2014, US$1 billion disappeared from three of Moldova's leading banks. In two days, loans worth US$1 billion were transferred in to United Kingdom and Hong Kong-registered companies whose ultimate owners are unknown. Banks are administered by the National Bank of Moldova, so this loss was covered from state reserves.

Health and fertility

The total fertility rate (TFR) in Moldova was estimated in 2015 at 1.56 children/woman, which is below the replacement rate of 2.1. In 2012, the average age of women at first birth was 23.9 years, with 75.2% of births being to women under 30, and 22.4% of births being to unmarried women. The maternal mortality rate was 41 deaths/100,000 live births (in 2010) and the infant mortality rate was 12.59 deaths/1,000 live births (in 2015). The life expectancy in 2015 was estimated at 70.42 years (66.55 years male, 74.54 years female).

Public expenditure on health was 4.2% of the GDP and private expenditure on health 3.2%. There are about 264 physicians per 100,000 people. Health expenditure was US$138 (PPP) per capita in 2004.

Since the breakup of the Soviet Union, the country has seen a decrease in spending on health care and, as a result, the tuberculosis incidence rate in the country has grown. According to a 2009 study, Moldova was struggling with one of the highest incidence rates of multidrug-resistant tuberculosis in the world.

The percentage of adults (aged 15–49) living with HIV/AIDS was estimated in 2009 at 0.40%.

Emigration

Emigration is a mass phenomenon in Moldova and has a major impact on the country's demographics and economy. The Moldovan Intelligence and Security Service has estimated that 600,000 to one million Moldovan citizens (almost 25% of the population) are working abroad.

Culture

Moldova's cultural tradition has been influenced primarily by the Romanian origins of its majority population, the roots of which go back to the second century AD, the period of Roman colonization in Dacia. Located geographically at the crossroads of Latin, Slavic and other cultures, Moldova has enriched its own culture adopting and maintaining traditions of neighbouring regions and of other influential sources. The largest ethnic group, which had come to identify itself widely as "Moldovan" by the 14th century, played a significant role in the shaping of classical Romanian culture. The culture has been also influenced by the Byzantine culture, the neighbouring Magyar and Slavic populations, and later by the Ottoman Turks. A strong Western European influence in Moldovan literature and arts was prevalent in the 19th century. During the periods 1812-1917 and 1944–89, Moldovans were influenced by Russian and Soviet administrative control as well and by ethnic Russian immigration.

The country's cultural heritage was marked by numerous churches and monasteries built by the Moldavian ruler Stephen the Great in the 15th century, by the works of the later renaissance Metropolitans Varlaam and Dosoftei, and those of scholars such as Grigore Ureche, Miron Costin, Nicolae Milescu, Dimitrie Cantemir and Ion Neculce. In the 19th century, Moldavians from the territories of the medieval Principality of Moldavia, divided into Bessarabia, Bukovina, and Western Moldavia (after 1859, Romania), made a significant contribution to the formation of the modern Romanian culture. Among these were many Bessarabians, such as Alexandru Donici, Alexandru Hâjdeu, Bogdan Petriceicu Hasdeu, Constantin Stamati, Constantin Stamati-Ciurea, Costache Negruzzi, Alecu Russo, Constantin Stere.

Mihai Eminescu, a late Romantic poet, and Ion Creangă, a writer, are the most influential Romanian language artists, considered national writers both in Romania and Moldova.

Cuisine

Moldovan cuisine is similar to neighbouring Romania, and has been influenced by elements of Russian, Turkish, and Ukrainian cuisine. Main dishes include beef, pork, potatoes, cabbage, and a variety of cereals. Popular alcoholic beverages are divin (Moldovan brandy), beer, and wine—of which the country is known for making high-quality offerings.

Traditional Moldovan dishes include plăcinte (sweet and savoury pastries with fillings such as local cheese, cabbage, potatoes, apples, sour cherries and others), mămăligă, sarmale, and a chicken soup called zeamă.

Total recorded adult alcohol consumption is approximately evenly split between spirits, beer and wine.

Holidays

Most retail businesses close on New Year's Day and Independence Day, but remain open on all other holidays. Christmas is celebrated either on 7 January, the traditional date in Old Calendarists Eastern Orthodox Churches, or on 25 December, with both dates being recognized as public holidays.

On 1 March features mărțișor gifting, which is a tradition that females are gifted with a type of talisman that is given for good luck.

Music

Among Moldova's most prominent composers are Gavriil Musicescu, Ștefan Neaga and Eugen Doga.

In the field of pop music, Moldova has produced the band O-Zone, who came to prominence in 2003, with their hit song "Dragostea Din Tei", which topped multiple notable single charts. Moldova has been participating in the Eurovision Song Contest since 2005. Another popular band from Moldova is Zdob și Zdub that represented the country in the 2005 Eurovision Song Contest, finishing sixth, also in 2021, with a similar result.

In May 2007, Natalia Barbu represented Moldova in Helsinki at the Eurovision Song Contest 2007 with her entry "Fight". Natalia squeezed into the final by a very small margin. She took tenth place with 109 points.
Then Zdob și Zdub again represented Moldova in the 2011 Eurovision Song Contest finishing 12th.

The band SunStroke Project with Olia Tira represented the country in the 2010 Eurovision Song Contest with their hit song "Run Away". Their performance gained international notoriety as an internet meme due to the pelvic thrusting and dancing of Sergey Stepanov, the band saxophonist. He has been dubbed "Epic Sax Guy". SunStroke Project featured again in the 2017 Eurovision entry "Hey Mama" which got third place.

In 2015 a new musical project by the name of Carla's Dreams has risen in popularity around Moldova. Carla's Dreams reached the top charts in multiple countries in Europe with the release of their song "Sub Pielea Mea" in 2016. The song received a lot of airplay and reached number one place on the charts in Moldova as well as Russia. The group is still active and released their latest album in 2017. The theme of the musical group is "Anonymous" as they perform with painted faces, hoodies and sunglasses. The identity of the group members is still unknown.

Among most prominent classical musicians in Moldova are Maria Bieșu, one of the leading world's sopranos and the winner of the Japan International Competition; pianist Mark Zeltser, winner of the USSR National Competition, Long-Thibaud-Crespin Competition in Paris and Busoni Competition in Bolzano, Italy.

Media

In October 1939, Radio Basarabia, a local station of the Romanian Radio Broadcasting Company, was the first radio station opened in Chișinău. Television in Moldova was introduced in April 1958, within the framework of Soviet television. Through cable, Moldovan viewers can receive a large number of Russian channels, a few Romanian channels, and several Russian language versions of international channels in addition to several local channels. One Russian and two local channels are aired. Infotag is the state news agency.

Sports

Association football is the most popular team sport in Moldova. The governing body is the Moldovan Football Federation, which belongs to UEFA. The Moldova national football team played its first match in 1994, but never qualified to the UEFA European Championship. The most successful football club is Sheriff Tiraspol, the first and only Moldovan club to qualify for the group stage of the Champions League and the Europa League. Other winners of the Moldovan National Division include Zimbru Chișinău, Dacia Chișinău, FC Tiraspol and Milsami Orhei.

Trîntă (a form of wrestling) is the national sport in Moldova. Rugby union is popular as well. More than 10,000 supporters turn out for home internationals. Since 2004, playing numbers at all levels have more than doubled to 3,200. Despite the hardships and deprivations the national team are ranked 34th in the world. The most prestigious cycling race is the Moldova President's Cup, which was first run in 2004. In chess, the Republic of Moldova has several international masters, among which can be mentioned Viorel Iordăchescu, Dmitry Svetushkin, and Viorel Bologan.

Radu Albot is one of the most successful Moldovan tennis players, with ATP singles (2019 Delray Beach Open) and doubles (2015 Istanbul Open) titles.

Athletes from Moldova have won European medals in athletics, biathlon, football, and gymnastics; world medals in archery, judo, swimming, and taekwondo; as well as Olympic medals in boxing, canoeing, shooting, weightlifting, and wrestling. Moldova made its Olympic debut at the 1994 Winter Olympics in Lillehammer. Olympic medalists include Sergei Mureiko, Oleg Moldovan, Vitalie Grușac, Veaceslav Gojan, and Serghei Tarnovschi. Nicolae Juravschi represented the Soviet Union at the 1988 Seoul Games, winning two medals.

See also

 Outline of Moldova

Notes

References

External links

S.Res.148 - A resolution to express the sense of the Senate that the United States should support the right to self-determination of the people of the Republic of Moldavia and northern Bucovina

Moldova. The World Factbook. Central Intelligence Agency.
Moldova, Republic of from UCB Libraries GovPubs.

Moldova profile from the BBC News.

 Key Development Forecasts for Moldova from International Futures.

 
Landlocked countries
Romanian-speaking countries and territories
Russian-speaking countries and territories
Member states of the Commonwealth of Independent States
Member states of the Council of Europe
Member states of the Organisation internationale de la Francophonie
Member states of the United Nations
Republics
States and territories established in 1991
1991 establishments in Europe
Countries in Europe
Eastern European countries